Notorious Nick  is the 2021 biopic that tells the true story of Nick Newell, a wrestler who born without his left arm, and who won the 2012 Xtreme Fighting Championship (XFC).  The film stars Cody Christian as Nick Newell and Elisabeth Röhm as Nick's mother, Stacey Newell.

References

External links 
 Official Website

2021 biographical drama films